is a major office development by Mori Building Company in Minato, Tokyo. Completed in 1986, the complex includes the ANA InterContinental Tokyo Hotel, the ARK Mori Building (a 37-floor, almost  mixed-use tower), the world-class Suntory Hall concert hall, a TV studio and several apartment buildings. TV Asahi still uses its former headquarters as an annexe for some of its departments and subsidiaries; the network's headquarters themselves were moved nearby building designed by Fumihiko Maki in 2003. Every September the area celebrates with an autumn festival that includes music, dancing, food, art, and shopping.

The name "ARK" is derived from the location of the complex at the intersection of the Akasaka, Roppongi, and Kasumigaseki districts. (Another explanation is that the name stands for Akasaka and Roppongi Knot.)  It is built on a slight slope, rather than a hill.

The heliport on the roof of the Ark Mori Building used to provide direct flights between Narita International Airport and Ark Hills (approximately 20 minutes) it was discontinued on December 1, 2015.

Buildings
Ark Mori Building
Ark Towers East
Ark Towers West
Ark Towers South
Suntory Hall
Ark Hills Side
Ark Hills Executive Tower
Ark Hills Annex

Ark Hills was expanded with the 22-storey Ark Hills Front Tower in 2011 and the 47-storey Ark Hills Sengokuyama Mori Tower in 2012.

See also
Ark Hills Sengokuyama Mori Tower
Roppongi Hills

References

External links

Ark Hills (Mori Building)

Roppongi
Buildings and structures in Minato, Tokyo
Mori Building
Buildings and structures completed in 1986
1986 establishments in Japan